Arthi Jayaraman is an Indian-American scientist who is the Centennial Term Professor for Excellence in Research and Education at the University of Delaware. Her research considers the development of computational models to better understand polymer nanocomposites and biomaterials. Jayaraman was elected Fellow of the American Physical Society in 2020.

Early life and education 
Jayaraman earned her undergraduate degree at the Birla Institute of Technology and Science, Pilani. She moved to the United States for her graduate studies, where she majored in chemical engineering. For her doctoral research Jayaraman studied biomimetic polymers and pattern recognition. She moved to the University of Illinois at Urbana–Champaign for a postdoctoral position, where she worked in the Department of Materials Science.

Research and career 
Jayaraman was appointed to the faculty at the University of Colorado Boulder, where she was made Patten Assistant Professor. Her early academic research was supported by the United States Department of Energy (DOE), and considered the use of polymer nanocomposites for electronic devices. In an effort to manipulate their optical and electronic properties, Jayaraman makes use of computational design. She created a comprehensive molecular model that allows her to simulate the (semi-)conducting properties of molecular systems, making use of graphics processing units to inform the design of polymers and additives. These computational models allow Jayaraman to better understand the dispersal of additives through the nanocomposite system, which allows for better control of the mechanical properties.

Amongst the molecular models considered by Jayaraman, she has primarily focussed on coarse-grained modeling. Coarse-grained models incorporate the anisotropic, directional and specific interactions (for example, hydrogen bonding etc.) of soft materials, including nanocomposites and biomaterials. In 2014 Jayaraman moved to the University of Delaware. Here she oversaw the graduate program in Chemical and Biomolecular Engineering (CBE). She serves on the editorial boards of the American Chemical Society journals Macromolecules (as Associate Editor) and ACS Polymers Au (Deputy Editor). She currently directs an NSF-funded NRT interdisciplinary graduate traineeship on computing and data science for materials innovation, design, and analytics  ( .

Awards and honours 

 2010 Department of Energy Early Career Research Award
 2011 University of Colorado Boulder Faculty Achievement Award
 2013 American Institute of Chemical Engineers COMSEF Division Young Investigator Award
 2014 American Chemical Society PMSE Young Investigator Award
 2014 University of Colorado Boulder Teaching Award
 2016 Princeton University Saville Lectureship at Princeton University
 2020 Elected Fellow of the American Physical Society
 2021 American Institute of Chemical Engineers COMSEF Impact Award

Selected publications

References 

American chemical engineers
Birla Institute of Technology and Science, Pilani alumni
Fellows of the American Physical Society
21st-century engineers
University of Delaware people
Year of birth missing (living people)
Living people